Pyotr Petrovich Vershigora (first name also Petr) or Petro Petrovych Vershyhora ( – 23 March 1963) was one of the leaders of the Soviet partisan movement in Ukraine, Belarus and Poland and later a writer.

Petro Vershigora was born in the village of Severinovca near the Transnistrian town of Rybnitsa. His parents were ethnic Ukrainian teachers at the local rural school, who died during his childhood. As a young orphan he worked at various jobs, including shepherd, miller, and librarian, as well as amateur actor and musician in his native village. In 1927, after completing his conscript military service, he enrolled in the Odessa Fine Arts Academy and upon graduation worked as an actor and stage manager. 

In 1936 Vershigora completed his studies at cinema school and worked on several documentary films with the Kiev cinematographic company. Following the German invasion of the Soviet Union, he joined the Red Army. On 23 June 1942 he was air dropped on a reconnaissance mission in the German-occupied Oryol region with orders to join the underground resistance movement there. 

Within a few months Vershigora joined the partisan units led by Sydir Kovpak in northeastern Ukraine. After the death of Semyon Rudnev in the summer of 1943, he became Kovpak's right-hand man and the head of his scouting and reconnaissance elements. Under his leadership, the 1st Ukrainian Partisan Division raided German-occupied western Belarus and eastern Poland, harassing the German rear. On 3 July 1944 they joined the regular Soviet army that was fighting to expel German forces from Belarus. In August 1944, after three years of fighting, Vershigora was promoted to the rank of major general.

After the war Vershigora taught at the military academy in Moscow and wrote a number of books, including Lyudi s chistoi sovestyu (People with a Clear Conscience, 1947), his memoirs about the war.

Honours and awards
 Hero of the Soviet Union
 Two Orders of Lenin
 Order of the Red Banner
 Order of Bogdan Khmelnitsky 1st class
 Medal "Partisan of the Patriotic War" 1st class
 Medal "For the Victory over Germany in the Great Patriotic War 1941–1945"

References
 War Hero Pyotr Vershigora
 People with a Clear Conscience — Pyotr Petrovich Vershigora's Memoirs

1905 births
1963 deaths
People from Camenca District
People from Olgopolsky Uyezd
Transnistrian people of Ukrainian descent
Soviet major generals
Soviet military personnel of World War II
Soviet partisans in Ukraine
Soviet writers
Ukrainian writers
Ukrainian people of World War II
Stalin Prize winners
Heroes of the Soviet Union
Recipients of the Order of Lenin
Recipients of the Order of the Red Banner
Recipients of the Order of Bogdan Khmelnitsky (Soviet Union), 1st class
Ukrainian anti-fascists